Cismont is an unincorporated community in Albemarle County, Virginia.

Castle Hill and Grace Episcopal Church are listed the National Register of Historic Places.

Zion Hill Baptist is a historically Black Church in Cismont.  In December 1974, Dr. R. A. Johnson was pastor.

Notable residents
Ralph Horween (1896–1997), Harvard Crimson All-American and National Football League football player.

References

Unincorporated communities in Virginia
Unincorporated communities in Albemarle County, Virginia